Pareiorhaphis stomias is a species of catfish in the family Loricariidae. It is native to South America, where it is known only from Brazil, with its type locality being listed as the Araranguá River basin in the state of Santa Catarina. The species reaches 5.2 cm (2 inches) in standard length and is believed to be a facultative air-breather. Its specific name, stomias, refers to its large mouth.

References 

Loricariidae